Mircea Rădulescu (born 31 August 1941, in Bucharest) is a Romanian former football player and manager.

Life and career
Rădulescu was born in Bucharest and has appeared in nearly 300 football matches. He was a member of Rapid București at junior level and after that he joined FC Sportul Studențesc București, being part of the great team that promoted in 1971–72 to Liga I. He spent his entire career with Sportul.

He later coached the national teams of Romania, Egypt, Syria and Algeria.

Honours

Player
Sportul Studențesc
Divizia B: 1971–72

Manager
Sportul Studențesc
Balkans Cup: 1979–80
Cupa României runner-up: 1978–79

Club Africain
Arab Cup Winners' Cup: 1995

References

Selected publications

 
 

1941 births
Living people
Footballers from Bucharest
Romanian footballers
FC Sportul Studențesc București players
Romanian football managers
Romania national football team managers
Expatriate football managers in Tunisia
FC Rapid București managers
Egypt national football team managers
Syria national football team managers
Algeria national football team managers
Expatriate football managers in Algeria
Club Africain football managers
FC Sportul Studențesc București managers
CS Universitatea Craiova managers
FC U Craiova 1948 managers
FC Voluntari managers
Romanian expatriate football managers
Romanian expatriate sportspeople in Algeria
Association footballers not categorized by position
Romanian expatriate sportspeople in Syria
Romanian expatriate sportspeople in Tunisia
Expatriate football managers in Syria
Romanian expatriate sportspeople in Egypt
Expatriate football managers in Egypt